Secondhand Daylight is the second studio album by English post-punk band Magazine. It was released on 30 March 1979 by record label Virgin. One single, "Rhythm of Cruelty", was released from the album.

Writing 
Unlike the group's former album Real Life, Howard Devoto did not contribute to writing the music for most of the tracks. Instead, the writing credits were split between band members: Devoto, John McGeoch and Dave Formula each wrote songs alone and in collaboration with Barry Adamson and Devoto/McGeoch wrote one song together. Devoto again provided lyrics for all compositions with the exception of the instrumental "The Thin Air", reputedly because the group ran out of studio time.

Recording 
The new lineup was stable until mid-1980 and consisted of Devoto (vocals), McGeoch (guitar and saxophone), Adamson (bass), Formula (keyboards) and newly recruited drummer John Doyle. The first release with Doyle had been the "Give Me Everything" single from November 1978.

The album was recorded in January 1979 at Good Earth Studios in London and using Virgin Records' mobile studio, which was used at Farmyard Studios. The album was produced and engineered by Colin Thurston. The album was Thurston's first production job; significantly, he had worked as an engineer for David Bowie's "Heroes" and Iggy Pop's The Idiot.

Release 
The album was originally released as an LP (with a gatefold sleeve) and as a cassette in March 1979. It peaked at No. 38 on the UK Albums Chart. The album was subsequently released as a budget album on LP, cassette and CD in the late 1980s. A remastered edition of the album was released by Virgin/EMI in 2007, along with the other three of the band's first four studio albums, including four bonus tracks and liner notes by Kieron Tyler. The original artwork featured an illustration by Ian Pollack, photography by Richard Rayner-Canham and typography by Malcolm Garrett.

Reception

Upon its release, Secondhand Daylight was hailed in the NME. Reviewer Nick Kent described songs like "Feed the Enemy" as "very Low-period Bowiesque", due to the "stray saxophone bleats and lulling synthesiser chords". Sounds was less positive; music journalist Garry Bushell declared that Magazine were in "retreat to the '70s progressive lie".

On its US release a year later, Richard C. Walls in Creem was also unimpressed: "musically and lyrically this stuff is old hat. There's no new wave succinctness here, no economy or irony. Just a surfeit of Pink Floydian chord coasting behind bleak and wintry lyrics."

Track listing

Personnel 

 Magazine

 Howard Devoto – vocals
 John McGeoch – guitar, saxophone, backing vocals, keyboards ("The Thin Air")
 Barry Adamson – bass, backing vocals
 Dave Formula – keyboards
 John Doyle – drums, percussion

 Technical

 Colin Thurston – production, engineering
 Tony Wilson – production on "Give Me Everything" and "I Love You, You Big Dummy"
 JJ Allom – engineering
 Bill Aitken – engineering on "Give Me Everything" and "I Love You, You Big Dummy"
 Ian Pollock – sleeve illustration
 Richard Rayner-Canham – sleeve photography
 Malcolm Garrett – sleeve typography and images

Charts

Further reading

References

External links 

 

1979 albums
Magazine (band) albums
Albums produced by Colin Thurston
Virgin Records albums
Post-punk albums by English artists